Duane Eugene Kuiper (born June 19, 1950), nicknamed "Kuip", is an American sportscaster and former professional baseball player. As a player, he was a second baseman for the Cleveland Indians and San Francisco Giants of Major League Baseball (MLB). Save for one year, Kuiper has been a television and radio broadcaster for the Giants since 1986, and is one half of the popular "Kruk and Kuip" duo alongside his friend and former teammate Mike Krukow. He briefly left the Giants in 1993 to work for the expansion Colorado Rockies, but returned in 1994.

Early life
Kuiper, his two brothers, and one sister, grew up on a  farm in Sturtevant, Wisconsin, near Racine. He played baseball at Jerome I. Case High School in Racine, Wisconsin.

College career
Kuiper is a graduate of Southern Illinois University in Carbondale, Illinois, where he was a member of the Tau Kappa Epsilon fraternity. His roommate was Dan Radison, a long-time minor and major league coach.

Professional career

Drafts and minor leagues
Kuiper was drafted by the New York Yankees out of Jerome I. Case High School in the twelfth round of the 1968 Major League Baseball Draft, but chose instead to attend Indian Hills Community College. He was drafted by the Seattle Pilots, Chicago White Sox and Cincinnati Reds while attending Indian Hills, but did not sign with any of these clubs. After a season at Southern Illinois University, he was drafted by the Boston Red Sox in the fourth round of the 1971 June Secondary Amateur Draft, but again did not sign. It wasn't until graduating from Southern Illinois that Kuiper finally said yes to the Cleveland Indians, who drafted him in the first round of the 1972 January Secondary Amateur Draft.

Cleveland Indians (1974–1981)
He made his major league debut on September 9 as a late inning defensive replacement for Jack Brohamer, and grounded into a double play in his only at-bat. However, he fared far better in his future plate appearances, collecting nine singles, two doubles, two walks and four RBIs in 24 plate appearances.

Following the season, the Indians dealt Brohamer to the White Sox, clearing a spot for Kuiper to play every day.

He hit his only career home run against Chicago White Sox pitcher Steve Stone on August 29, . Kuiper holds the major league record for most career at-bats with exactly one home run in the live-ball era. Since the game in question was on national television, Kuiper's singular feat was captured on video. (Giants telecasts, for which Kuiper is currently an announcer, will run the highlight from time to time to poke fun at him. On April 25, 2014, the Giants held "Duane Kuiper Home Run Bobblehead Night" for their game against the Indians.)

On May 30, Kuiper scored the only run for either team in Dennis Eckersley's no-hitter against the California Angels.

On July 27, playing against the Yankees at Yankee Stadium, Kuiper hit two bases-loaded triples. He is one of only three Major League players to accomplish this feat, the other two players being Elmer Valo (1949) and Bill Bruton (1959).

On May 15, Len Barker pitched a perfect game against the Toronto Blue Jays with Kuiper at second base. Kuiper fielded five ground balls to contribute to the effort. Shortly after Kuiper suffered a knee injury that caused him to miss most of the  season, the Indians acquired Alan Bannister from the White Sox. He batted .257 with 14 RBI that season.

San Francisco Giants (1982–1985)

Kuiper was dealt from the Indians to the San Francisco Giants for pitcher Ed Whitson on November 15, 1981. He backed up Hall of famer Joe Morgan his first season in San Francisco, and batted .255 in three-plus seasons platooning at second for the Giants before being released by the club on June 28, . He and future broadcast partner Mike Krukow were both on the Giants from 1983 to 1985, where they formed their friendship.

Broadcasting career
Kuiper's broadcasting career began while still a player, hosting his own KNBR radio show from 1982 to 1985. After retiring from playing baseball, Kuiper provided commentary for the Giants from 1986 to 1992.  With uncertainty over whether the Giants would move to Florida for the 1993 season, Kuiper left for a one-year stint with the expansion Colorado Rockies. Kuiper returned to broadcast for the Giants in 1994, where he has remained since.

Kuiper's call of Bonds' 715th home run to pass Babe Ruth is considered the historic call for that home run, as radio announcer Dave Flemming's microphone cut out at the exact moment the ball was hit. Kuiper made the TV call for Barry Bonds' historic 756th home run which broke Hank Aaron's record (although the historic call is that of KNBR radio announcer Jon Miller). Kuiper's call of Bonds' 756th career home run: 

On November 1, 2010, Kuiper made the historic call for the final out of Game 5 of the 2010 World Series that resulted in the Giants' first title since :

On June 13, 2012, Kuiper called Matt Cain's perfect game: 

In that same game, Kuiper also called a play in the seventh inning, where Gregor Blanco made a diving catch in right field to preserve the perfect game: 
 
While principally a television play-by-play announcer on NBC Sports Bay Area, Kuiper also shares radio play-by-play duties with Dave Flemming on KNBR when the Giants television broadcast is carried over-the-air on KNTV and Jon Miller handles the television play-by-play. He also fills in on the radio side when Flemming is unable to announce games due to his second job as an ESPN college football and basketball announcer. During Giants post-season play, Kuiper and broadcast partner Mike Krukow move over to the radio side and call games with Miller and Flemming while the television broadcasts are handled by network sportscasters.

Kruk and Kuip can be heard in the Electronic Arts video games MVP Baseball 2003, MVP Baseball 2004, and MVP Baseball 2005. In December 2010, both Kuiper and Krukow signed six-year extensions to continue as Giants announcers.

Kuiper missed calling much of the 2021 season after a cancer diagnosis that required chemotherapy, but he returned to a limited schedule—all home games and 20 road games, called remotely from San Francisco—in the 2022 season.

Commentating style

Kuiper uses a deep voice when a player swings and misses, when a dramatic play is made, and when he calls home runs.

Kuiper is noted for his distinctive calls beginning and ending each game: after the result of the first batter of the game, he says, "And that's how this game gets started"; when the ball game is over, Kuiper says, "And that's the ball game!"

When Kuiper states the pitch count on a batter, he often calls "nothing" in lieu of calling "a ball" and the current number of strikes when the count is "no balls". Kuiper often uses the phrase "Got 'em!" when an out is recorded.

His trademark home run call is "He hits it high... hits it deep... it is (or this baby is) OUTTA HERE!" or "HIGH DRIVE... LEFT (or RIGHT) FIELD... IT IS (sometimes: THIS BABY IS) OUTTA HERE!" Another popular home run saying, "THAT ONE'S HIGH, AND DEEP, AND... GONE! A HOME RUN!"

In April 2010, Kuiper coined a new slogan from a fan's sign for the SF Giants club:  "Giants baseball... torture!"  This slogan is used generally if the games are either tense, tight, or very close, in which the Giants have later won by a small margin.

Personal life
Kuiper lives in Danville, California. He was married to Michelle Kuiper for 36 years before she died  on February 20, 2022. Together, they had two children: a son, Cole, who is married to Rachel Jensen Kuiper and a daughter, Dannon, who is married to Zack Rease. Kuiper has two granddaughters named Andy (born 2019) and Kit (born 2021).

Kuiper is just one in a family of baseball broadcasters, all working in the San Francisco Bay Area. His younger brother, Glen Kuiper, is the play-by-play announcer for the Oakland Athletics, a job mirroring his older brother's a few miles across the bay. Their middle brother, Jeff, is a television producer for the Giants who produces Duane's broadcasts.

For many years, Kuiper would visit his family's farm in Sturtevant, Wisconsin whenever the Giants played the Brewers in Milwaukee. The farm continued to be owned by his father, Henry Kuiper, until the elder Kuiper sold it in 2018 so that the land could be redeveloped into a hospital complex. Henry Kuiper died in 2019 from natural causes at age 95. 

Kuiper is a cousin of former MLB player Dick Bosman.

References

Further reading

External links

Duane Kuiper at SABR (Baseball BioProject)

1950 births
Living people
Baseball players from Wisconsin
Cleveland Indians players
Colorado Rockies announcers
Indian Hills Community College alumni
Indian Hills Falcons baseball players
Major League Baseball broadcasters
Major League Baseball second basemen
Oklahoma City 89ers players
People from Danville, California
Reno Silver Sox players
San Antonio Brewers players
San Francisco Giants announcers
San Francisco Giants players
Southern Illinois Salukis baseball players
Sportspeople from Racine, Wisconsin
Sportspeople from the Milwaukee metropolitan area
Southern Illinois University alumni
Tigres de Aragua players
American expatriate baseball players in Venezuela